Stephen Austen Thorpe FRS is a British oceanographer, Professor of Oceanography, University of Southampton, 1986–2003, now emeritus.  He was elected a Fellow of the Royal Society in 1991 and was President of the Royal Meteorological Society.

References

Further reading
 'Thorpe, Prof. Stephen Austen’, Who's Who 2012, A & C Black, 2012; online edn, Oxford University Press, Dec 2011 ; online edn, Nov 2011 accessed 10 Jan 2012

Date of birth unknown
Academics of the University of Southampton
British oceanographers
Fellows of the Royal Society
Living people
Presidents of the Royal Meteorological Society
Year of birth missing (living people)